The Prosperous Few and the Restless Many is a short book compiling three revised interviews of the United States academic Noam Chomsky by David Barsamian, originally conducted on December 16, 1992, January 14 and 21, 1993.

Contents
 The new global economy
 NAFTA and GATT - who benefits?
 Food and Third World "economic miracles"
 Photo ops in Somalia
 Slav vs. Slav
 The chosen country
 Gandhi, non-violence and India
 Divide and conquer
 The roots of racism
 The unmentionable five letter word
 Human nature and self-image
 It can't happen here - can it?
 Hume's paradox
 "Outside the pale of intellectual responsibility"

1994 non-fiction books
Books by Noam Chomsky
Books about globalization
Political books